Carlos Coste (born in Caracas, Venezuela, on February 2, 1976) is a Venezuelan professional free-diver. He started his training in apnea and Free-diving in 1996, and got his first national record in 1998. In October 2002 he broke his 1st Official World Record (actually 2x WR in one week: FIM -93m and CWT -90m). In October 2003, he became the first human to achieve a Free Immersion  dive of more than 100 meters (-101m, Venezuela 2003), certified by AIDA World Record and Guinness World Records. He also was the first freediver to pass 100 meters in constant weight, reaching a 102 meter immersion in Cyprus 2004. Coste became First AIDA Depth Individual World Champion. He won the World Championship making a new World Record in Constant Weight -105m, celebrated in Nice, 2005. He broke the AIDA (International Association for the Development of Apnea) world record for variable weight free-diving, with a 140 meter immersion in the Red Sea, Egypt, on May 9, 2006. This record was superseded by Herbert Nitsch, on 7 December 2009 at Dean's Blue Hole in the Bahamas. In 2010, after a long relationship, he married his manager Gabriela Contreras (Gaby)

His achievements have been recognized with Venezuela National Sports Institute (June 2005) and with the Orden José Félix Rivas granted by the Venezuelan president (February 2005). He studied Mechanical Engineering at the Central University of Venezuela. In 2017 received the honorary membership distinction of ONDA Venezuela and became part of its Underwater Activities Committee.

References

External links
 Carlos Coste's official web site
 AIDA World Records History

1976 births
Living people
Sportspeople from Caracas
Venezuelan freedivers